A Bloom in Vain and Other Songs is the debut studio album by Dia Chakravarty, released on 22 August 2014.

Background
Dia Chakravarty, having studied law at the University of Oxford, chose songs of composers, who, except for Dwijendralal, studied law, including Tagore who eventually dropped out; and except for Rajanikanta, every one of them went to England for higher studies.

In August 2014, Chakravarty told New Age, "Music is my passion and runs through my blood. I love to sing Bangla songs of almost every genre."

Composition
The album consists of four pairs of tracks by a quartet of composers – Rabindranath Tagore, Atulprasad Sen, Dwijendralal Ray, and Rajanikanta Sen from the late 1800s to early 1900s. It was arranged by Prattyush Banerjee and recorded by Goutam Basu in Usha Uthup's music studio "Studio Vibrations" in Kolkata.

Release
The album was released by Laser Vision on 22 August 2014. at Sufia Kamal Auditorium at Bangladesh National Museum.

Critical response
Mosabber Rahman of Dhaka Tribune said of Chakravarty, "Her voice lacks pretension, and she has the sincerity of a schoolgirl preparing for the final exam."

Track listing

See also
Music of Bengal

References

External links

2014 albums
Bengali-language albums
Laser Vision albums
Dia Chakravarty albums
Adaptations of works by Rabindranath Tagore